The 1995 Vanderbilt Commodores football team represented Vanderbilt University in the 1995 NCAA Division I-A football season as a member of the Eastern Division of the Southeastern Conference (SEC). The Commodores were led by head coach Rod Dowhower in his first season and finished with a record of two wins and nine losses (2–9 overall, 1–7 in the SEC).

Schedule

Source: 1995 Vanderbilt football schedule

Personnel

References

Vanderbilt
Vanderbilt Commodores football seasons
Vanderbilt Commodores football